Glycylpeptide N-tetradecanoyltransferase 1 also known as myristoyl-CoA:protein N-myristoyltransferase 1 (NMT-1) is an enzyme that in humans is encoded by the NMT1 gene. It belongs to the protein N-terminal methyltransferase and glycylpeptide N-tetradecanoyltransferase family of enzymes.

References

Further reading

See also
 Myristoylation
 N-myristoyltransferase 2

External links 
 

EC 2.3.1
Human proteins